Gavin O'Mahony (born 11 June 1987) is an Irish sportsperson.  He plays hurling with his local club Kilmallock and was a member of the Limerick senior inter-county team from 2007 until 2017.

O'Mahony announced his retirement from inter-county hurling in November 2017.

Honours
Limerick
Munster Senior Hurling Championship (1): 2013
National Hurling League (Div 2): 2012
Kilmallock
Limerick Senior Hurling Championship (3): 2010, 2012, 2014
Munster Senior Club Hurling Championship (1): 2014
Munster
Railway Cup (1): 2013

References

 

1987 births
Living people
Kilmallock hurlers
Limerick inter-county hurlers
Munster inter-provincial hurlers